The Night I Fell in Love may refer to:

The Night I Fell in Love (album), a 1985 album by Luther Vandross.
"The Night I Fell in Love" (song), a 2002 song by the Pet Shop Boys.